Ye Zhaoying (born 7 May 1974) is a retired badminton player from Hangzhou, China. Officially ranked as the number one women's singles player in the world for the first time in December 1995, she lost and regained that ranking several times during her career. Her best years as a player overlapped those of the slightly older Susi Susanti and Bang Soo-hyun, in what some see as a "golden" era in women's badminton.

She retired after the 2000 Sydney Olympic Games, and in 2002, she started a new career as a golfer, trained at the Tian An Golf Club. She married former Chinese footballer and top-scoring striker Hao Haidong in summer 2019.

Career 
Her main achievements include winning the World Grand Prix Finals in 1995, 1997 and 1999, the IBF World Championships in 1995 and 1997, and the IBF World Cup in 1995. She played on Chinese teams that won the Uber Cup in 1992, 1998 and 2000 and the Sudirman Cup in 1995 and 1997. She won the prestigious All-England title in 1997, 1998 and 1999.

Her other titles include: Asian Badminton Championships in 1992, 1994, 1995, 1998, 1999; Japan Open in 1993, 1996, 1999; Indonesia Open in 1992, 1993; Denmark Open in 1993; Hong Kong Open in 1993; Asian Cup of badminton in 1994; China Open in 1995; Swedish Open in 1995; US Open in 1995; Singapore Open in 1992, 1998, 1999; Thailand Open in 2000 . She was a member of the Chinese Women's Badminton Team that won the Asian Games in 1998. In addition, she earned a bronze medal in the Sydney Olympic Games in 2000, having been upset in the quarterfinals of the '96 Games in Atlanta. Ye Zhaoying was elected to the World Badminton Hall of Fame in 2009.

Personal life
Ye married former top footballer Hao Haidong  in summer 2019.

Political views and controversy 
On the 31st anniversary of the 1989 Tiananmen Square protests in 2020, Hao uploaded a video calling for the overthrow of the Chinese Communist Party.
Afterwards the couple's Weibo accounts were deleted; their online profiles on major portals in China – Sina Sports, Tencent Sport and Baidu – have also been deleted. They moved to Spain, living in exile.

Two years later, in an interview with TV 2 Sport with Camilla Martin, Ye stated that the Chinese coaches ordered her to lose in the semi-final match at the 2000 Olympics, in order for her teammate, Gong Zhichao to win the title for China, as she was thought to be able to defeat Martin in the final. She ended up losing in 2 sets to Gong in the semi-final, and went on to win the bronze medal after defeating Dai Yun in the playoff. In the interview, Ye strongly criticized the Chinese system for doing so, and stated that if she had won the match in the semi-final and lost in the final, "all of China" would have considered her a "traitor", adding on that her previous victories would have been "meaningless", had she not won the gold for China.

In response, the Chinese embassy in Denmark issued a statement, stating that "She (Ye Zhaoying) has always been anti-China. Her statements don't deserve a response." 

After the entire incident in 2020, family and friends have turned their backs on Hao and Ye, and that they have been blocked by their former teammates on Chinese social messaging platform WeChat.

Achievements

Olympic Games 
Women's singles

World Championships 
Women's singles

World Cup 
Women's singles

Asian Games 
Women's singles

Asian Championships 
Women's singles

Asian Cup 
Women's singles

IBF World Grand Prix 
The World Badminton Grand Prix sanctioned by International Badminton Federation (IBF) since 1983.

Women's singles

Women's doubles

Record against selected opponents 
Record against year-end Finals finalists, World Championships semi-finalists, and Olympic quarter-finalists.

References

External links 
 
 

1974 births
Living people
Sportspeople from Hangzhou
Badminton players from Zhejiang
Chinese female badminton players
Badminton players at the 1996 Summer Olympics
Badminton players at the 2000 Summer Olympics
Olympic badminton players of China
Olympic bronze medalists for China
Olympic medalists in badminton
Medalists at the 2000 Summer Olympics
Badminton players at the 1994 Asian Games
Badminton players at the 1998 Asian Games
Asian Games gold medalists for China
Asian Games bronze medalists for China
Asian Games medalists in badminton
Medalists at the 1994 Asian Games
Medalists at the 1998 Asian Games
World No. 1 badminton players